Dominique Horwitz (born 23 April 1957) is a French film and television actor and singer.

Life
Horwitz was born on 23 April 1957 in Paris, France, to German Jewish refugee parents, who had both fled Nazi Germany. In 1971 the family moved to Berlin. He attended a Franco-German grammar-school. He has a sister and a brother. For about twenty years, Horwitz was located in Hamburg where he was married. From his first marriage with his wife Patricia he has two children, the actress Miriam and Laszlo. He currently lives with his second wife Anna and the children Mick and Marlene in Tiefengruben, Bad Berka, a village near Weimar in Thuringia. He is a prominent supporter of social institutions in Weimar, where he helps unemployed youths in a boxing club. He also organises boxing tournaments and links them with culture. Between the boxing matches musical newcomers can perform their music.

Career
He has appeared in over thirty films and over fifty television productions. His first screen role was appearing as Leo Singer in the film David (1979).

In 1992, Horwitz received the Golden Lion Award for the Best Actor from the Venice Film Festival.

He played the role of the Devil (pegleg) in the theatre production The Black Rider (William S. Burroughs, Robert Wilson, Tom Waits).

Horwitz is perhaps best known for playing Obergefreiter Fritz Reiser in Stalingrad (1993).

Selected filmography

Television work

References

External links

1957 births
Living people
Jewish German male actors
German male film actors
German male television actors
French people of German-Jewish descent
French emigrants to Germany
French Jews
20th-century German male actors
21st-century German male actors
20th-century German Jews
Französisches Gymnasium Berlin alumni